1966 Soviet Class B was a Soviet football competition at the Soviet third tier.

Russian Federation

Semifinal Group 1
 [Novorossiysk]

Semifinal Group 2
 [Kaluga]

Semifinal Group 3
 [Tula]

Semifinal Group 4
 [Orjonikidze]

Final Group
 [Nov 5-13, Orjonikidze]

Ukraine

Final playoff
 Dinamo Khmelnitskiy          0-0 1-1 Avangard Zholtyye Vody

Additional Final
 [Nov 25, Kiev] 
 Avangard Zholtyye Vody       2-1  Dinamo Khmelnitskiy

For 3rd place
 Desna Chernigov              0-0 0-2 Lokomotiv Kherson

Central Asia

Union republics
 [Oct 23-30, Tkibuli]

References
 All-Soviet Archive Site
 Results. RSSSF

Soviet Second League seasons
3
Soviet
Soviet